The Hackettstown School District is a comprehensive community public school district that serves students in kindergarten through twelfth grade from Hackettstown, in Warren County, New Jersey, United States. The district serves students in four schools: two elementary schools (covering K-4), a middle school (5-8), and a four-year high school (9-12).

As of the 2019–20 school year, the district, comprised of four schools, had an enrollment of 1,975 students and 170.5 classroom teachers (on an FTE basis), for a student–teacher ratio of 11.6:1.

The district is classified by the New Jersey Department of Education as being in District Factor Group "DE", the fifth-highest of eight groupings. District Factor Groups organize districts statewide to allow comparison by common socioeconomic characteristics of the local districts. From lowest socioeconomic status to highest, the categories are A, B, CD, DE, FG, GH, I and J.

The high school serves students Hackettstown, as well as those from the townships of Allamuchy, Independence, and Liberty, as part of sending/receiving relationships.

Awards and recognition
For the 2001-02 school year, Hackettstown Middle School was recognized with the National Blue Ribbon Award of Excellence from the United States Department of Education, the highest honor that an American school can achieve.

Schools
Schools in the district (with 2019–20 enrollment data from the National Center for Education Statistics) are:
Elementary schools
Hatchery Hill School with 299 students in grades K-1
Marie Griffin, Principal
Willow Grove School with 340 students in grades 2-4
Lauren Thomas, Principal
Middle school
Hackettstown Middle School with 457 students in grades 5-8
Sheena Delgaizo, Principal
High school
Hackettstown High School with 864 students in grades 9-12
Kyle Sosnovik, Principal

Administration
Core members of the district's administration are:
David C. Mango, Superintendent of Schools
Tim Havlusch, Business Administrator / Board Secretary

Board of education
The district's board of education, comprised of eleven members, sets policy and oversees the fiscal and educational operation of the district through its administration. As a Type II school district, the board's trustees are elected directly by voters to serve three-year terms of office on a staggered basis, with either three or four seats up for election each year held (since 2012) as part of the November general election. The board appoints a superintendent to oversee the day-to-day operation of the district.

References

External links
Hackettstown School District

School Data for the Hackettstown School District, National Center for Education Statistics

Hackettstown, New Jersey
New Jersey District Factor Group DE
School districts in Warren County, New Jersey